Sead Čelebić (born 26 February 1956) is a former Bosnian football midfielder who played in the former Yugoslavia and Turkey.

Career
Born in Višegrad, Čelebić started playing football for the youth side of FK Sutjeska Nikšić. In 1977, he signed his first professional contract with the club, but would leave for Yugoslav First League side FK Borac Banja Luka in January 1980.

He transferred to Sarıyer G.K. before the 1982-1983 season, playing five seasons with the club in the Süper Lig. After his playing career ended, he applied for Turkish citizenship and changed his name to Saffet Çelebi.

References

External links
 BiH Timovi u Yu ligi
 EX YU Fudbalska Statistika po godinama
 Profile at Strukljeva.net
 

1956 births
Living people
Yugoslav footballers
FK Sutjeska Nikšić players
FK Borac Banja Luka players
Sarıyer S.K. footballers
Süper Lig players
Expatriate footballers in Turkey
Association football midfielders